2 October is a 2003 Indian Hindi-language action thriller film directed and produced by Sunil Tiwary. This movie was released on 5 September 2003 under the banner of Sarthak Movies.

Plot 
One day the police commissioner discovers that Interpol-wanted criminal Bhau is staying in Bombay. He informs the matter to Chief Minister. C.M instructs him to secretly finish Bhau because he is politically influenced. Hence the commissioner gives a charge to Karan Abhayankar. Karan is a fearless and honest police officer trying to clean the city from the gangster. Karan targets Bhau to wipe out in 2 October because this is the birthday of Mahatma Gandhi, father of the nation. To fulfill his mission, Karan faced many obstacles from influential people.

Cast 
 Ashutosh Rana as Karan Abhyankar
 Shivaji Satam as Chief Minister
 Avtar Gill as Police commissioner
 Sharat Saxena as Bhau
 Saadhika Randhawa as Swapna
 Rocky Verma as Mohan
 Mukesh Tiwari
 Makarand Deshpande

Music 
The music is by Sunil Jha and the lyrics were penned by Sunil Jha and A. K. Vyas.

1. Chand Taaron Mein Nazar Aye
by Udit Narayan, Sadhana Sargam

2. Chand Taaron Mein (Sad)
by Udit Narayan

References 

2003 films
2000s Hindi-language films
Indian action thriller films
2003 action thriller films

External links